Captain Mark Rudkin was a member of the British Army stationed at St. John's, Newfoundland. He was the last person to duel in Newfoundland, and caused the loss of life to Ensign John Philpot of the Royal Veteran Companies also stationed at St. John's.

Rudkin, an Irish native a 22-year veteran of the British Army who had served in the Peninsular War in the Low Countries and in America was no stranger to combat, having been wounded various times and had also been a prisoner of war, was considered by many a good officer and a perfect gentleman.

The conflict 
Rumour has it that both Rudkin and Philpot were adversaries for some time and they both were vying for the affections of the daughter of a prominent citizen of St. John's who lived at Quidi Vidi Village. On one occasion during a social function Philpot was goaded into insulting Rudkin but soon afterwards apologized. On Wednesday, March 29, 1826 most of the officers of the Royal Veteran Companies gathered at the quarters of Captain Matthew Henry Willock for a party and friendly game of lanscolet. A controversy arose to the ownership of a £2.8/6 pot that resulted in some exchange of words and Philpot tossing water in Rudkin's face. After repeated attempts to resolve the matter by gentlemanly means Rudkin, according to the Laws of Honour, felt obliged to call out Philpot.

The duel 
In the early afternoon of March 30, 1826 they proceeded to a site about a mile from St. John's at West's Farm near Brine's Tavern at the foot of Robinson's Hill adjacent to Brine's River.  Rudkin's second was Dr. James Coulter Strachan (1794 - 1827), assistant surgeon of the Royal Veteran Company while Captain George Farquhar Morice (of ) acted as Philpot's second.

Wallis and Banks pistols were used, but while Philpot was considered a good shot, Rudkin was an expert marksman.  Strachan give the signal to fire, while Philpot's shot missed its intended target it grazed Rudkin's collar, Rudkin had fired aimlessly into the air in hope that the disagreement would be settled amicably. Philpot refused and thus a second round was prepared.

This time Morice gave the signal to fire to which Philpot was mortally wounded and died soon afterwards on the field. Rudkin, agitated and confused, ran to Fort Townshend and reported the incident to his commanding officer.

The trial 
On April 17, 1826 the trial began with Chief Justice Richard Alexander Tucker presiding. Rudkin was charged with murder in the first degree, while Strachan and Morice were charged as accessories in the second degree. At the conclusion of the trial the Chief Justice addressed the jury began to give his personal feeling of the Laws of England and there was no Law of Honour in the British court system and had admonished the accused prisoners. The jury returned with a verdict of Guilty — but without malice. The Chief Justice was furious, and refused to accept the verdict and sent the jury back to deliberate further. Twenty minutes later the jury returned with a not guilty verdict.

References 

Rudkin, Mark
Canadian duellists